Doto formosa is a species of sea slug, a nudibranch, a marine gastropod mollusc in the family Dotidae.

Distribution
This species was first described from Rhode Island, United States.

Description
This nudibranch is pale brown with no markings.

EcologyDoto formosa'' feeds on hydroids.

References

Dotidae
Gastropods described in 1875